Myles A. Brown is an American oncologist who studies connections between hormones, breast cancer, and prostate cancer, particularly focusing on the role of estrogen receptors. He is Emil Frei III Professor of Medicine in the Harvard Medical School, and director of the Center for Functional Cancer Epigenetics in the Dana–Farber Cancer Institute.

Brown was elected to the National Academy of Sciences in 2016, the American Academy of Arts and Sciences in 2017, and the National Academy of Medicine in 2020.

References

External links

Year of birth missing (living people)
Living people
American oncologists
Harvard Medical School faculty
Fellows of the American Academy of Arts and Sciences
Members of the National Academy of Medicine
Members of the United States National Academy of Sciences